Phintia is a genus of moths of the family Notodontidae first described by Francis Walker in 1854. It consists of the following species:
Phintia broweri J. S. Miller, 2009
Phintia podarce Walker, 1854

Notodontidae of South America